İmamqulukənd (also, Imamqulukənd, Imamakulukend, Imamkulikend, Imamkulikend-Kishlak, and Imamkulukend) is a village and municipality in the Qusar Rayon of Azerbaijan.  It has a population of 2,798.  The municipality consists of the villages of İmamqulukənd and Suduroba.

See also 
The village is so named because it was built by a man named İmamqulu in 1899.

References 

Populated places in Qusar District